Margarosticha euprepialis is a moth in the family Crambidae. It was described by George Hampson in 1917. It is found in Australia, where it has been recorded from Queensland, Western Australia and the Northern Territory.

References

Acentropinae
Moths described in 1917